The Notre Dame Symphony Orchestra is the primary orchestra of the University of Notre Dame.  The orchestra is an ensemble of 70-80 players devoted to the orchestral music of the 18th through 20th centuries. The orchestra is open to all members (students, faculty and staff) of the Notre Dame community; non-music majors who wish to continue instrumental performance during their college careers are particularly encouraged to participate. The orchestra currently rehearses on Tuesday evenings and presents three campus concerts in the Marie DeBartolo Center for the Performing Arts. The orchestra also occasionally takes off-campus tours.

Each year a concerto competition for instrumental performers is held in November with the winner or winners appearing with the orchestra in concert during the spring semester. General auditions for new and returning members of the orchestra are held during the first week of fall classes, but individual auditions can be arranged by appointment.

Notable performances
In the spring of 2006, the orchestra performed with the Grammy-award-winning band known as "The Chieftains" at Carnegie Hall in New York City for a St. Patrick's Day concert.

In the spring of 2007, the orchestra went on a Florida tour, visiting sights and enlivening audiences with their music. In January 2011, the orchestra went on a similar tour through the gulf coast, making stops in Florida, Alabama, New Orleans, and Tennessee.

In the fall of 2007, the symphony performed with the acclaimed jazz master Dave Brubeck and his quartet.  This performance included some of Brubeck's own mass pieces, such as "To Hope!" and "Upon This Rock" with full choral accompaniment.

In June 2017, the orchestra went on their first European tour which included cities in Poland, Germany and the Czech Republic.

Organization

Director 
Daniel Stowe, a native of the Los Angeles area, is the orchestra's conductor.  He received his undergraduate degree in music and international relations from the University of California, Davis, and holds graduate degrees from the University of Southern California and Cornell University, with research interests in the sacred and secular music of the 16th century. He has conducted the University Chorus, Chamber Singers and Early Music Ensemble of U.C. Davis, as well as the Cornell Chorale. In addition to conducting the Notre Dame Symphony Orchestra, he also leads the Notre Dame Glee Club and the Notre Dame Collegium Musicum. He is a founding member of the plainchant ensemble Schola Musicorum and has appeared in Notre Dame Opera productions of Wolfgang Amadeus Mozart's The Marriage of Figaro, Don Giovanni, and Così Fan Tutte. Stowe contributed articles on Renaissance, Baroque and 20th-century Latin American composers to the Harvard Biographical Dictionary of Music.

Notes

External links
 Notre Dame Symphony Orchestra
 Orchestra Website
 Notre Dame Department of Music

University orchestras
Symphony orchestras
Musical groups established in 2000
University of Notre Dame musical groups